is a former Japanese football player.

Playing career
Shikida was born in Chiba Prefecture on November 25, 1977. After graduating from high school, he joined his local club JEF United Ichihara in 1996. He played as right side midfielder in 2 seasons. Through Chuo Gakuin University, he joined newly was promoted to J2 League club, Albirex Niigata. Although he played many matches in 2 seasons, he retired end of 2000 season.

Club statistics

References

External links

1977 births
Living people
Chuo Gakuin University alumni
Association football people from Chiba Prefecture
Japanese footballers
J1 League players
J2 League players
JEF United Chiba players
Albirex Niigata players
Association football midfielders